Panthea furcilla (tufted white pine caterpillar or eastern panthea) is a species of moth of the  family Noctuidae. It is found across the boreal forest region of Canada west to the Rocky Mountains, and in the eastern parts of the United States, from Maine to Florida, west to Texas, north to Indiana and Ohio.

It has a wingspan of 33–50 mm. The moth flies from June to August in a single brood in Canada, but in two or more generations in the southern United States, depending on the location.

The larvae feed on eastern larch, pines, and Spruces.

Subspecies
There are two recognised subspecies:
Panthea furcilla australis Anweiler, 2009
Panthea furcilla furcilla (Packard, 1864)

The supposed species P. pallescens is today considered a form of P. furcilla with no taxonomic standing.

References

External links

butterfliesandmoths.org
Species info at Bug Guide
Info on larval stage

Pantheinae
Moths of North America
Taxa named by Alpheus Spring Packard
Moths described in 1864